The following is the standings of the 2009–10 2nd Division football season. This is the 3rd rated football competition in Iran after the Azadegan League and Persian Gulf Cup.

It will be divided into two phases: the regular season, played from October 2009 to March 2010, and the Second round from March to June 2010.

The league will also be composed of 36 teams divided into four divisions of 9 teams each, whose teams will be divided geographically.  Teams will play only other teams in their own division, once at home and once away for a total of 16 matches each.

In each division, two teams are promoted to Second round, and two teams are relegated to  2nd Division and plus one relegation playoff losers from each division will be relegated to 3rd Division. In Second round, in each division two teams are promoted to Azadegan League. In total, the league promotes 4 teams to Azadegan League and relegates 10 teams to 3rd Division.

League standings

Group A

Group B

Group C

Group D

Second round

Group A

Group B

Third  Round

Championship final
First leg to be played May 28, 2010; return leg to be played June 3, 2010

Third place play-off
First leg to be played May 28, 2010; return leg to be played June 3, 2010

Relegation play-off
First leg to be played April 13, 2010; return leg to be played April 20, 2010

(R)Palayesh Gaz Ilam Relegated to 3rd Division.

First leg to be played April 13, 2010; return leg to be played April 20, 2010

(R)Armin Tehran Relegated to 3rd Division.

Player statistics

Top goalscorer
21 goals
  Soheil Haghshenas (Sepidrood)

League 2 (Iran) seasons
3